The following is a list of people from Dickinson County, Kansas. Inclusion on the list should be reserved for notable people past and present who have resided in the county, either in cities or rural areas.

Academia
 C. Olin Ball, food scientist, inventor
 Deane Malott, university administrator

Arts and entertainment
 Harry Beaumont, director and silent film actor
 Frankie Burke, actor
 Henry Poor, artist and architect

Athletics
 Ralph Faulkner, Olympic fencer
 Robert Rubel, college football coach
 Hy Vandenberg, Major League Baseball pitcher

Clergy
 Bruce Blake, Bishop of the United Methodist Church
 John Eastwood, World War II US Army Air Corps chaplain, was stationed at Herington Army Airfield
 Emil Kapaun, Roman Catholic priest and Servant of God, United States Army chaplain, and Medal of Honor recipient

Journalists
 Steve Doocy, journalist, author
 Oscar Stauffer, founder of Stauffer Communications

Military
 Joseph Engle, Space Shuttle astronaut
 Terry Nichols, served in U.S. Army, accomplice in the Oklahoma City bombing of the Alfred P. Murrah Federal Building
 Everett Stewart, World War II flying ace

Old West
Notable people from the American Old West include:
 Phil Coe, gambler 
 John Hardin, gunfighter
 Wild Bill Hickok, lawman
 Joseph McCoy, cattle baron
 Tom "Bear River" Smith, lawman
 Ben Thompson, gunfighter 
 Libby Thompson, prostitute and dance hall girl

Politicians
 Joseph Burton, U.S. Senator from Kansas
 Edward Little, U.S. Representative from Kansas
 Kenneth McLeod, Canadian politician
 Frank Parent, California court judge
 Seymour Stedman, lawyer and Socialist candidate for Vice-President of the United States

Eisenhower family
 Dwight D. Eisenhower, 34th President of the United States and five-star general 
 Earl D. Eisenhower
 Edgar N. Eisenhower
 Milton S. Eisenhower

Others
 Marlin Fitzwater, press secretary to Ronald Reagan and George Bush
 Gregory Frazier, former Chief Agricultural Negotiator for the United States
 Ebby Halliday, centenarian and successful realtor
 Pop Hollinger, pioneer of the market for comic book collection and restoration

See also

 Lists of people from Kansas

References

Dickinson County